Emmanuel Mulenga (born 26 November 1979) is a Zambian politician. He served as Member of the National Assembly for Ndola Central between 2016 and 2021, and as Minister of Sport, Youth and Child Development from 2019 to 2021.

Biography
Prior to entering politics Mulenga was a businessman and owned the Easy Mining company. He was chosen as the Movement for Multi-Party Democracy candidate for Ndola Central for the 2011 general elections, but was defeated by Fackson Shamenda of the Patriotic Front. Prior to the 2016 general elections, he was nominated as the Patriotic Front candidate after Shamenda (who was serving as Minister of Labour and Social Security) opted not to contest the elections. Mulenga and was subsequently elected to the National Assembly with a 12,983 vote majority.

After becoming an MP, Mulenga joined the Committee on Local Government Accounts and the Committee on Agriculture, Lands and Natural Resources. In July 2019 he was appointed Minister of Sport, Youth and Child Development. He lost his seat in the 2021 elections

References

1979 births
Living people
Zambian businesspeople
Movement for Multi-Party Democracy politicians
Patriotic Front (Zambia) politicians
Members of the National Assembly of Zambia
Sport, Youth and Child Development ministers of Zambia